The 1941 Delaware Fightin' Blue Hens football team was an American football team that represented the University of Delaware in the 1941 college football season. In its second season under head coach William D. Murray, the team compiled a 7–0–1 record, shut out four of eight opponents, and outscored all opponents by a total of 176 to 26.

Schedule

References

Delaware
Delaware Fightin' Blue Hens football seasons
College football undefeated seasons
Delaware Fightin' Blue Hens football